Transportation in San Diego consists of a variety of air, road, sea, and public transportation options.

Public transportation

San Diego is served by the San Diego Trolley, bus (operated by the San Diego Metropolitan Transit System), COASTER, and Amtrak. The trolley primarily serves downtown and surrounding urban communities, Mission Valley, east county, the coastal south bay, and the international border. A planned Mid-Coast line will operate from Old Town to University City along the Interstate 5 Freeway. There are also plans for a Silver Line to expand trolley service downtown.

The Amtrak and COASTER trains currently run along the coastline and connect San Diego with Los Angeles, Orange County, San Bernardino, Riverside, and Ventura via Metrolink. There are two Amtrak stations in San Diego, in Old Town and Downtown.

The bus is available along almost all major routes; however, a large number of bus stops are concentrated in central San Diego. Typical wait times vary from 15 to 60 minutes, depending on the location and route . Trolleys arrive at each station every 7 to 30 minutes (depending on time of day and which trolley line is used). Ferries are also available every half hour crossing San Diego Bay to Coronado.

Public transportation statistics
The average amount of time people spend commuting with public transit in San Diego, CA, for example to and from work, on a weekday is 70 min. 23% of public transit riders, ride for more than 2 hours every day. The average amount of time people wait at a stop or station for public transit is 16 min, while 29% of riders wait for over 20 minutes on average every day. The average distance people usually ride in a single trip with public transit is 11.2 km, while 30% travel for over 12 km in a single direction.

Cycling
The dry and mild climate of San Diego makes cycling a convenient and pleasant year-round option. The city has some segregated cycle facilities, particularly in newer developments, however the majority of road facilities specifically for bicycles are painted on regular roadways, covering over 1,570 miles throughout San Diego County. The city's hilly, canyoned terrain and long average trip distances—brought about by strict low-density zoning laws—somewhat restrict cycling for utilitarian purposes.

In 2014 of .9% of commuters traveled by bicycle, below the average 1% for large U.S. cities. Also in 2014, San Diego experienced 6.8 bicyclist fatalities per 10,000 cyclist commuters, the average for all large cities was 4.7.

A bicycle sharing system called Decobike was instituted in 2015.

Air
San Diego has two major international airports entirely or extending into its city limits:

San Diego International Airport, also known as Lindbergh Field, is the primary commercial airport serving San Diego. It is the busiest single-runway airport in the United States, and is the third busiest single-runway airport in the world, only behind London Gatwick and Mumbai. It serves over 24 million passengers every year, and is located on San Diego Bay three miles (4.8 km) from downtown. There are scheduled flights to the rest of the United States, Canada, Japan, Mexico, United Kingdom, Germany, and Switzerland. It serves as a focus city for Southwest Airlines and Alaska Airlines. Voters rejected a proposal to move the airport to Miramar Marine Corps Air Station in November 2006.

Since December 9, 2015, the Cross Border Xpress terminal in Otay Mesa has given direct access to Tijuana International Airport, with passengers walking across the U.S.–Mexico border on a footbridge to catch their flight on the Mexican side. It is the only airport in the world with terminals located on the territory of two countries.

Other airports include Brown Field Municipal Airport (Brown Field) and Montgomery Field.

Sea
The Port of San Diego manages the maritime operations of San Diego harbor. Cruise ships arrive and depart from San Diego's cruise ship terminal on B Street Pier. Carnival Cruise Lines and Holland America have home port cruise ships in San Diego during the winter season. A second cruise terminal on Broadway Pier opened in 2010.

San Diego is home to General Dynamics' National Steel and Shipbuilding Company (NASSCO), the largest shipyard on the West Coast of the United States. It is capable of building and repairing large ocean-going vessels. The yard constructs commercial cargo ships and auxiliary vessels for the U.S. Navy and Military Sealift Command, which it has served since 1960.

Roads

The streets and highways of San Diego reflect the automotive city development as well as its "urban sprawl" historic growth pattern. Major freeways were built and repeatedly expanded to serve the needs of commuters coming into the city from the suburban regions of North County, South Bay, and East County, as well as the Tijuana metropolitan area. The importance of tourism to the city also stimulated the development of roads, since 70% of tourists visiting San Diego arrive by car.

Major highways

Interstates
San Diego is the terminus of three primary interstate highways. The region is also served by one three-digit auxiliary interstate.

California State Routes
State highways in San Diego include the following:

.

Major streets
 Rosecrans Street (formerly California State Route 209)
 Balboa Avenue (formerly California State Route 274)
 El Cajon Boulevard (Interstate 8 business loop, formerly part of U.S. Route 80)

See also
 Transportation in San Diego–Tijuana

References

External links

 

San Diego, California